Sir Thomas Talbot (born 1507/1508 died 1 August 1558), of Bashall, Yorkshire, Rishton and Lower Darwen, Lancashire, was an English politician.

He was a Member (MP) of the Parliament of England for Lancashire in 1558.

References

1558 deaths
English MPs 1558
Members of the Parliament of England (pre-1707) for Lancashire
People from Ribble Valley (district)
Year of birth uncertain